Daadshah is a 1983 Iranian Persian-language film depicting the life and experiences of Baloch rebel Dad Shah in the Balochistan insurgency.

Plot
Mir Dad Shah or Mir Daad Shah was a farmer who lived in Nillag village of Iranian Balochistan in the 1950s. He hated Mohammad Reza Pahlavi an oppressive administration which made him to pick up arms against shah. Daad Shah's wife Bibi Hatun also fought with him against his enemies. Dad Shah was support by Iraq through local Balochi politician Mir Abdi, who went into self-exile in Iraq for his people national struggle. Dad Shah killed tribal chief Sardar Muhammad Darani of Zahedan. Sardar Darani was the commander-in-chief of Zahedan area during Reza Shah. In 1957, Daad Shah's tribal chiefs who betrayed him, by called him for negotiation and where he was killed in a gun battle by Iranian Forces. Mir Abdi persuaded by the Shah to return to Iran and gave privileges to stop his struggle for Baloch people. The struggle came to an end by an agreement between Iran and Iraq, where Iran stopped support for the Kurdish struggle in Iraq, while Iraq deprived the Baloch from theirs. But later Iraq gave support to Balochi secretly till the 1980s, when Iran–Iraq War began Balochi groups given large amount of support in financial and weapons.
The most comprehensive research about Dadsh movement wrote by Dr. Azim shahbakhsh in Persian which called “Pazhuhesh-i dar tārikh-i mo'āser-i Baluchistān: mājerā-i Dadshah," (1372, Shiraz, Iran, Navid) A survey in Balochistan contemporary history, Dadeshah adventure, 1993, Shiraz, Iran, Navid publisher.

External links
http://www.barahoot.com/balouchestan/shakhsiyatha/Daadshah/Majara.htm
https://web.archive.org/web/20070929195216/http://shopping.ketab.com/addprod.asp?id=20360&cat=3&cast=jafar+valli&pgs=1
http://www.sarbaaz.com/daad_shaah.htm
https://web.archive.org/web/20070927231146/http://irancinema.ir/films/?ac=to&co=70&se=
https://web.archive.org/web/20070927231201/http://irancinema.ir/films/review/?co=70&se=

Iranian drama films
Persian-language films
Balochi-language films